Elachisina is a genus of small sea snails in the family Elachisinidae.

Species
 Elachisina azoreana Rolán & Gofas, 2003
 Elachisina bakeri (A. M. Strong, 1938)
 Elachisina canaliculata Rolán & Rubio, 2001
 Elachisina canarica (F. Nordsieck & Talavera, 1979)
 Elachisina catenata Rolán & Gofas, 2003
 Elachisina colellai Cunha, Santos & S. Lima, 2016
 Elachisina eritima (E. A. Smith, 1890)
 Elachisina floridana (Rehder, 1943)
 Elachisina globuloides (Warén, 1972)
 Elachisina grippi Dall, 1918
 Elachisina gubbiolii Rolán & Gofas, 2003
 Elachisina iredalei (Brookes, 1926)
 Elachisina johnstoni (F. Baker, Hanna & A. M. Strong, 1930)
 Elachisina pelorcei Rolán & Gofas, 2003
 Elachisina pergrandis Rolán & Gofas, 2003
 Elachisina robertsoni Kay, 1979
 Elachisina saxicola (C. B. Adams, 1852)
 Elachisina senegalensis Rolán & Gofas, 2003
 Elachisina tenuisculpta Rolán & Gofas, 2003
Species brought into synonymy
 Elachsina versiliensis Warén, Carrozza & Rocchini, 1990: synonym of Laeviphitus verduini van Aartsen, Bogi & Giusti, 1989
 Elachisina ziczac H. Fukuda & Ekawa, 1997: synonym of Nozeba ziczac (H. Fukuda & Ekawa, 1997) (original combination)

References

 Dall, W. H. (1918). Changes in and additions to molluscan nomenclature. Proceedings of the Biological Society of Washington. 31: 137-138. page(s): 137 
 Ponder W. F. (1985) The anatomy and relationships of Elachisina Dall (Gastropoda Rissoacea). Journal of Molluscan Studies 51(1): 23-34
 Rolán E. & Gofas S. (2003) The family Elachisinidae (Mollusca, Rissooidea) in the temperate and tropical Atlantic. Iberus 21(2): 67-90

Elachisinidae